Seal Island is a small island off the northwest coast of Anguilla.  It is located some two kilometres to the east of the Prickly Pear Cays at 18° 16' N, 63° 9' W, and lies at the centre of the Seal island Reef System Marine Park. 

The area is popular with scuba divers.  A reef lying between the island and Anguilla can make access more difficult.

References

Tourist attractions in Anguilla
Uninhabited islands of Anguilla